Ayam kecap or ayam masak kicap is an Indonesian Javanese chicken dish poached or simmered in sweet soy sauce (kecap manis) commonly found in Indonesia, Malaysia and Singapore.

History and origin
Fried chicken in sweet soy sauce is a typical chicken dish commonly served across Indonesia. However, it is more precisely of Javanese-Chinese origin. The recipe follows the production of Indonesian kecap manis (sweet soy sauce). Historically, soy sauce production is linked to Chinese influence in the archipelago. However, Indonesian Javanese version of soy sauce has its own twist, which is a generous addition of thick liquid palm sugar (gula jawa) with consistency of molasses. The ayam kecap pedas is spicier version which also adds a generous amount of chili pepper.

Regional variations

Indonesia

In Indonesia, ayam kecap is pieces of chicken simmered in kecap manis (sweet soy sauce), spiced with shallot or onion, garlic, ginger, pepper, leek and tomato. Other versions may add richer spices, including nutmeg and cloves. In Indonesia, the term ayam kecap is often interchangeable with ayam goreng kecap (a variant of ayam goreng in sweet soy sauce) and semur ayam (Indonesian sweet soy stew which uses chicken instead of beef). These are all similar—if not almost identical—recipes of chicken cooked in sweet soy sauce. However, recipes for semur ayam often add richer spices, such as clove, cinnamon and star anise. On the other hand, ayam goreng kecap has thicker sweet soy sauce and is often served with slices of fresh lime or a splash of lime juice. The main difference is probably its water content: although still quite moist, both ayam kecap and ayam goreng kecap are usually dryer and use thicker soy sauce, compared to semur ayam, which is more watery.

Ayam kecap commonly uses poached chicken cut in pieces, including the bones. However, there is a variant called ayam panggang kecap which uses identical sweet soy sauce and spices, but substitutes a boneless chicken fillet that is grilled instead of fried.

Malaysia

The Malay ayam masak kicap (lit.: chicken cooked in soy sauce) is different from the Chinese version of soy sauce chicken as the chicken meat is cut into pieces and mixed with its own spices. The Malaysian ayam masak kicap usually consist of spices similar to its Indonesian counterpart, Malaysian style ayam masak kicap are usually par-fried first as ayam goreng kunyit (turmeric fried chicken) before being simmered. It can also feature potato in the stew.

See also 

 Adobo - A similar style dishes from the Philippines 
 Ayam bakar
 Ayam goreng
 Ayam taliwang
 Babi kecap
 Soy sauce chicken
 Satay
 Sweet soy sauce
 List of chicken dishes

References

External links 
Resep ati ampela ayam

Javanese cuisine
Indonesian chicken dishes
Malaysian chicken dishes